Banos or Baños may refer to:
Banos, Landes, a commune in the Landes department of France
Baños de Agua Santa, a city and popular tourist destination in Tungurahua Province, Ecuador
Baños Canton, Ecuador, of which Baños de Agua Santa is the capital
Baños District, Peru
Baños, Azuay, a suburb of Cuenca, Ecuador
Los Baños, Laguna, a municipality known, among other things, for its hot spring resorts in the Laguna province of the Philippines.

See also
Baños de Ebro
Baños de la Encina
Baños de Molgas
Baños de Montemayor
Baños de Tajo
Baños de Valdearados
Battle of Puerto de Baños